Piazza del Duomo ("Cathedral Square") is the main piazza (city square) of Milan, Italy.  It is named after, and dominated by, Milan Cathedral (the Duomo).  The piazza marks the center of the city, both in a geographic sense and because of its importance from an artistic, cultural, and social point of view. Rectangular in shape, with an overall area of 17,000 m2 (about 183,000 sq ft), the piazza includes some of the most important buildings of Milan (and Italy in general), as well some of the most prestigious commercial activities, and it is by far the foremost tourist attraction of the city.

While the piazza was originally created in the 14th century and has been gradually developing ever since (along with the Duomo, which took about six centuries to complete), its overall plan, in its current form, is largely due to architect Giuseppe Mengoni, and dates to the second half of the 19th century.  The monumental buildings that mark its sides, with the main exception of the Duomo itself and the Royal Palace, were introduced by Mengoni's design; the most notable of Mengoni's addition to the piazza is the Galleria Vittorio Emanuele II arcade.

History

The origins of Piazza del Duomo can be traced back to the vision of Azzone Visconti (lord of Milan from 1329 to 1339). In 1330, Azzone ordered the demolition of the taverns that circled the two central churches of Milan of the time, the Basilica di Santa Maria Maggiore and the Basilica of Santa Tecla, to create a market square, called "Piazza dell'Arengo", which is the first incarnation of what is now Piazza del Duomo. The piazza was named after the arengario (also known as the "broletto"), i.e., the seat of the local government. None of the original buildings of Piazza dell'Arengario has survived.

Azzone's successor Gian Galeazzo Visconti further enlarged the piazza, ordering the demolition of the bishop's house (in 1385) and the baptistery San Giovanni alle Fonti (in 1387). In the following decades, nevertheless, the piazza did not develop much, but one of the two basilicae, Santa Maria Maggiore, was demolished, as the works for the construction of the Duomo had begun. In 1458, Pope Pius II granted Francesco Sforza and the Veneranda fabbrica del Duomo di Milano (the company that was responsible for the construction of the Duomo) the authorization to demolish Santa Tecla to create a larger square that would fit the Duomo's majesty. Somewhat preposterously, the basilica was partially rebuilt in the following years, to be demolished again in the mid-16th century.

The next major modification of the piazza occurred in the second half of the 18th century, when architect Giuseppe Piermarini thouroghly redesigned the former arengario into the modern Royal Palace; a side effect of Piermarini's design was that of creating another smaller piazza, adjacent to Piazza del Duomo, and thus actually enlarging the open space area.

In the 19th century, architect Giulio Beccaria was hired by Ferdinand I of Austria to redesign the piazza again. Beccaria's main contribution to the urban planning of the area was the construction of the palace that thereafter would serve as the headquarters of the Fabbrica del Duomo, located to the south-east of the cathedral.

A major twist in the piazza's evolution came about after the Second Italian War of Independence (1859). In 1860, the government of the city proclaimed the intention to radically redesign the piazza and to create a new major avenue to celebrate King Victor Emmanuel II of Italy. Several architectural design competitions followed, whereby the plan of the new piazza gradually took place. The restructuring was eventually commissioned to architect Giuseppe Mengoni, and the works began in 1865. From 1865 to 1873, based on Mengoni's design, the piazza was first enlarged (an entire neighborhood, the "Rebecchino", was demolished for this purpose, as well as the popular porticated building called Coperto dei Figini) and then acquired most of its modern landmarks, including the Galleria Vittorio Emanuele II arcade (built in 1864–1867) and the two "Palazzi dei Portici" ("Portico Palaces") that mark its southern and northern boundaries.

Mengoni's work, in any case, was not hitchless. The company that was responsible for the works, City of Milan Improvements Company of London, eventually experienced financial problems, so that the government of Milan had to take charge. Part of the area of the Galleria was sold to private owners, with the obligation to complete the works according to Mengoni's design. In 1875, when the two Portico Palaces were finally completed, new funding problems endangered the realization of the two triumph arches that were included in the design; Mengoni eventually decided to fund the construction himself. When Mengoni died in 1877, only one of the arches, the one at the entrance of the Galleria, was completed; the construction of second arch was abandoned. Mengoni actually died in Piazza del Duomo, falling from a scaffolding while he was supervising the works.

In 1896, the statue of King Victor Emmanuel II of Italy was inaugurated in the centre of the piazza. This marked the completion of the restructuring initiated by the city authorities in 1860.

The last major change to the piazza occurred during the Fascist era, when the Arengario was built in the place where Mengoni had planned to create a second triumph arch, opposite across the square to the Galleria. The Arengario had the main purpose of letting the local podestà (or Benito Mussolini himself) make speeches to the population; it now houses a museum on 20th-century art.

It will host the closing ceremony of the 2026 Winter Paralympics.

Buildings and Monuments in and around Piazza

 Duomo di Milano (Milan Cathedral)
 Galleria Vittorio Emanuele II
 Palazzo dell'Arengario
 Palazzo Carminati
 Palazzo dei Portici Settentrionali
 Palazzo dei Portici Meridionali
 Royal Palace of Milan
 Monument to King Victor Emmanuel II

Gallery

External links

Tourist attractions in Milan
Duomo
Odonyms referring to a building
Odonyms referring to religion
Venues of the 2026 Winter Olympics